Anthony Masunga is the chief operating officer for Botswana Telecommunications Corporation, from the previous appointment of being a general manager and acting manager commercial. The Francistown-born Anthony Masunga started working as a chief operating officer and chief executive officer in January 2017.

Background 

Anthony Masunga has been appointed the managing director of the BTC company since the year 2017 inception and he served as the acting managing director of the same company since the year 2016 July 20 until he received the current appointment. Mr. Masunga served as Acting Managing Director of Botswana Telecommunications Corporation Limited since July 20, 2016 until January 1, 2017. He is the chief technical officer for the Mascom company.

Education 

Bachelor of Science
McGill University.
Anthony Masunga did his part 1 Bachelor of science at the University of Botswana and furthered his studies to do Bachelors in computer science at the McGill University in Canada, Montreal province. Anthony Masunga also holds a Master's degree in Business Administration from the De Montfort University.

Occupation

1995
Anthony Masunga had his first job after graduating at the national Bank of Botswana as a systems analyst in 1995. He only served one year contract and left for another company, his main role was to fix computer systems. He worked with too many controls.
1996
He got another job at the Botswana national productivity centre (Bnpc) in the year 1996 as a consultant for information technology and giving education to the government officials about the utilisation of the information communication technology tools in order to improve productivity. Anthony Masunga spent two operation years with the Botswana national productivity centre. Anthony together with his colleagues who were from the United kingdom at the Botswana national productivity centre established their own consulting firm which was closed down. Anthony later joined Mascom as an information technology manager. After three years Anthony was moved into another position of the chief technical officer at Mascom wireless company at the age of 32 as the first chief technical officer of Mascom.
2008
In the year 2008, Mr. Anthony Masunga joined the Be-mobile team, which after three months he took over to the Launch Director as the founding General Manager.

Role at BTC 

Mr. Anthony Masunga’s current role is to administer the merger of the BTC and BeMobile brands. His goal is to infuse a performance driven culture that will drive efficient service delivery across all clientele, grow their subscriber base as well as profitability.

Other Affiliations 

McGill University
Chief technical officer at Mascom

References

Botswana businesspeople
Living people
1973 births